Veeriku is a neighbourhood of Tartu located about 2 km west of the city centre, just beyond the railway that bisects the city.

References

Tartu